Meridiana–Kamen is a Croatian UCI Continental team founded in 2009, that participates in UCI Continental Circuits races.

Team roster

Major wins
2012
Stages 2 & 5 International Tour of Hellas, Enrico Rossi
Stage 4 International Tour of Hellas, Roberto Cesaro
Overall Okolo Slovenska
Stages 1 & 4, Enrico Rossi
Stage 2, Davide Rebellin
Stage 2 Tour de Serbie, Enrico Rossi
Stage 1 Giro di Padania, Enrico Rossi
Overall Tour du Gévaudan Languedoc - Roussillon, Davide Rebellin
Stage 2, Davide Rebellin
2013
Stage 2 Istrian Spring Trophy, Patrik Sinkewitz
Overall Settimana Ciclistica Lombarda, Patrik Sinkewitz
Stages 1 & 2, Patrik Sinkewitz

National champions
2015
 Croatia Road Race Emanuel Kišerlovski
2021
 Bosnia and Herzegovina Time Trial  Vedad Karic
 Bosnia and Herzegovina Road Race  Vedad Karic

References

External links

UCI Continental Teams (Europe)
Cycling teams established in 2009
Cycling teams based in Italy
Cycling teams based in Croatia